President is a 1987 game released by Kevin Toms for the Amstrad CPC, Commodore 64 and ZX Spectrum.

Gameplay 

Following on from Toms' Football Manager and Software Star games, President is a game where the player takes control of a small country, and decides whether to be a dictator, or a hero. The player has to balance the wants and needs of their virtual citizens, while also balancing the books and trying to build up an army and search for oil.

Reception
Your Sinclair gave the game a positive review, awarding it 7/10. Similarly, Sinclair User gave the game 4/5. However, Crash were less favourable, only awarding it 29%.

See also
President Elect

References

External links

Interview where Kevin talks about President

1987 video games
Addictive Games games
Amstrad CPC games
Commodore 64 games
Government simulation video games
Single-player video games
Strategic Simulations games
Video games developed in the United Kingdom
ZX Spectrum games